The Hansa-Brandenburg W.12 was a German biplane fighter floatplane of World War I. It was a development of Ernst Heinkel's previous KDW, adding a rear cockpit for an observer/gunner, and had an unusual inverted tailfin/rudder (which instead of standing up from the fuselage, hung below it) in order to give an uninterrupted field of fire.

The W.12s (under the Naval designation C3MG) served on the Western Front, based at the Naval air bases at Ostend and Zeebrugge. The aircraft had some success, and one shot down the British airship C.27.

In April 1918, a W.12 made an emergency landing in the neutral territory of the Netherlands, where it was interned and flight tested by the Dutch. In 1919 the government of the Netherlands bought a licence to build the aircraft. 35 W.12s were subsequently manufactured by the Van Berkel company of Rotterdam as the W-A, serving with the Dutch Naval Air Service until 1933.

Variants
 W.12 : German Navy model. 146 built.
 Van Berkel W-A : Dutch licence-built W.12, with Benz engine. 35 built.

Operators
 
 Kaiserliche Marine
 
 Dutch Naval Aviation Service

Specifications (W.12)

See also

References

Bibliography

External links

 airwar.ru
 earlyaviator.com photo

1910s German fighter aircraft
W.12
Floatplanes
Single-engined tractor aircraft
Biplanes
Aircraft first flown in 1917